Beta Centauri is a triple star system in the southern constellation of Centaurus. It is officially called Hadar. The Bayer designation of Beta Centauri is Latinised from β Centauri, and abbreviated Beta Cen or β Cen. The system's combined apparent visual magnitude of 0.61 makes it the second-brightest object in Centaurus and the eleventh brightest star in the night sky.

Nomenclature
β Centauri (Latinised to Beta Centauri) is the star system's Bayer designation.

It bore the traditional names Hadar and Agena. Hadar comes from the Arabic حضار (the root's meaning is "to be present" or "on the ground" or "settled, civilized area"), while the name Agena  is thought to be derived from the Latin genua, meaning "knees", from the star's position on the left knee of the centaur depicted in the constellation Centaurus. In 2016, the International Astronomical Union organized a Working Group on Star Names (WGSN) to catalog and standardize proper names for stars. The WGSN approved the name Hadar for the star β Centauri Aa on 21 August 2016 and it is now so entered in the IAU Catalog of Star Names.

The Chinese name for the star is 马腹一 (Mandarin: mǎ fù yī, "the First Star of the Horse's Abdomen").

The Boorong people indigenous to what is now northwestern Victoria, Australia named it Bermbermgle (together with α Centauri), two brothers who were noted for their courage and destructiveness, and who spear and kill Tchingal, "The Emu" (Coalsack Nebula). The Wotjobaluk people name the two brothers Bram-bram-bult.

Visibility
Beta Centauri is one of the brightest stars in the sky at magnitude 0.61. Its brightness varies by a few hundredths of a magnitude, too small to be noticeable to the naked eye. Because of its spectral type and the detection of pulsations, the Aa component has been classified as a β Cephei variable.

Beta Centauri is well known in the Southern Hemisphere as the inner of the two "Pointers" to the constellation Crux, popularly known as the Southern Cross. A line made from the other pointer, Alpha Centauri, through Beta Centauri leads to within a few degrees of Gacrux, the star at the north end of the cross. Using Gacrux, a navigator can draw a line with Acrux at the south end to effectively determine south.

Stellar system
The Beta Centauri system is made up of three stars: Beta Centauri Aa, Beta Centauri Ab, and Beta Centauri B. All the spectral lines detected are consistent with a B1-type star, with only the line profiles varying, so it is thought that all three stars have the same spectral type.

In 1935, Joan Voûte identified Beta Centauri B, giving it the identifier VOU 31. The companion is separated from the primary by 1.3 seconds of arc, and has remained so since the discovery, although the position angle has changed six degrees since. Beta Centauri B is a B1 dwarf with an apparent magnitude of 4.

In 1967, Beta Centauri's observed variation in radial velocity suggested that Beta Centauri A is a binary star. This was confirmed in 1999. It consists of a pair of stars, β Centauri Aa and β Centauri Ab, of similar mass that orbit each other over a period of 357 days with a large eccentricity of about 0.8245.

The pair were calculated to be separated by a mean distance of roughly 4 astronomical units (based on a distance to the system of 161 parsecs) in 2005.

Both Aa and Ab apparently have a stellar classification of B1 III, with the luminosity class of III indicating giant stars that are evolving away from the main sequence. Component Aa rotates much more rapidly than Ab, causing its spectral lines to be broader, and so the two components can be distinguished in the spectrum. Component Ab, the slow-rotating star, has a strong magnetic field although no detected abundance peculiarities in its spectrum. Multiple pulsations modes have been detected in component Aa, some of which correspond to brightness variations, so this star is considered to be variable. The detected pulsation modes correspond to those for both β Cephei variables and slowly pulsating B stars. Similar pulsations have not been detected in component Ab, but it is possible that it is also a variable star.

Aa is 12.02 ± 0.13 times as massive as the Sun, while Ab is 10.58 ± 0.18 times as massive.

References

Centauri, Beta
Beta Cephei variables
B-type giants
Centaurus (constellation)
122451
068702
Spectroscopic binaries
Triple star systems
Hadar
5267
Durchmusterung objects